Sibusiso Mthethwa (born 26 March 1991) is a South African professional soccer player who plays as a defender for South African Premier Division side Richards Bay.

References

1991 births
Living people
South African soccer players
Association football defenders
Free State Stars F.C. players
University of Pretoria F.C. players
Platinum Stars F.C. players
Stellenbosch F.C. players
Richards Bay F.C. players
South African Premier Division players
National First Division players